The Windows Driver Kit (WDK) is a software toolset from Microsoft that enables the development of device drivers for the Microsoft Windows platform. It includes documentation, samples, build environments, and tools for driver developers. A complete toolset for driver development also need the following: a compiler Visual Studio, Windows SDK, and Windows HLK.

History
Previously, the WDK was known as the Driver Development Kit (DDK) and supported Windows Driver Model (WDM) development. It got its current name when Microsoft released Windows Vista and added the following previously separated tools to the kit: Installable File System Kit (IFS Kit), Driver Test Manager (DTM), though DTM was later renamed and removed from WDK again.

The DDK for Windows 2000 and earlier versions did not include a compiler; instead one had to install Visual C++ separately to compile drivers. From the version for Windows XP the DDK and later the WDK include a command-line compiler to compile drivers. One of the reasons Microsoft gave for including a compiler was that the quality of drivers would improve if they were compiled with the same version of the compiler that was used to compile Windows itself while Visual C++ is targeted to application development and has a different product cycle with more frequent changes. The WDK 8.x and later series goes back to require installing a matched version of Visual Studio separately, but this time the integration is more complete in that you can edit, build and debug the driver from within Visual Studio directly.

DDK versions

Note: Windows NT DDK, Windows 98 DDK and Windows 2000 DDK are no longer made available by Microsoft because of Java-related settlements made by Microsoft with Sun Microsystems.

WDK versions

See also
 Windows Driver Frameworks
 Windows Driver Model
 Windows Logo Kit

References

Device drivers
Microsoft application programming interfaces
Microsoft development tools
Programming tools for Windows